Agnieszka Perepeczko (born 6 May 1942) is an Polish-born actress, best known for her performances after her emigration to Australia.

Biography

Perepeczko was born in Warsaw, in 1966 she graduated at Aleksander Zelwerowicz State Theatre Academy in Warsaw. She is best remembered for her appearance in the television series Prisoner, in which she played East German concentration camp survivor Hannah Geldschmidt.

She was married to the late stage and screen actor Marek Perepeczko.

External links
 
 Interview with Agnieszka Perepeczko

1942 births
Living people
Actresses from Warsaw
Polish actresses
Polish emigrants to Australia
Australian television actresses